Flavien Prat (born August 4, 1992, in Melun, Seine-et-Marne, France) is a jockey in Thoroughbred racing who was a Champion Apprentice Jockey and Group 1 race winner in France before moving full-time to the United States in 2015 where he has won several meet riding Championships plus numerous top races including four Breeders' Cup races,  the 2019 Kentucky Derby, and the 2021 Preakness Stakes.

Year-end charts

References

1992 births
Living people
French jockeys
American jockeys
Sportspeople from Melun
People from Monrovia, California